Gary Brown (born 29 October 1985) is an English former professional footballer.

Court case
Gary was found guilty of drunken behaviour at Blackburn Magistrates' Court on 18 December 2008 after using threatening behaviour towards a policeman whilst drunk on a Darwen football pitch. He was ordered to do 150 hours community service and fined £100.

References

External links

1985 births
People from Darwen
Living people
English footballers
Rochdale A.F.C. players
Runcorn Linnets F.C. players
A.F.C. Darwen players
Association football defenders